Conus nunesi is a species of sea snail, a marine gastropod mollusk, in the family Conidae, the cone snails and their allies.

Distribution
This marine species occurs off Angola.

References

New Angolan Species of Conus Linné, 1758 (Gastropoda: Conidae). Conchylia 49(3-4): 14-23

Endemic fauna of Angola
Conidae
Gastropods described in 2018